Nolan Hemmings (born 1970) is an English stage and film actor. He is known for his role as Charles E. Grant in Band of Brothers.

Early life
Hemmings is the son of British actor/director David Hemmings and American actress Gayle Hunnicutt. He is named after his father's character, Captain Nolan, in The Charge of the Light Brigade.

Career
An early appearance was as the young David in the 1986 BBC series David Copperfield. He may be most known worldwide for his portrayal of Staff Sergeant Charles 'Chuck' Grant in the HBO miniseries Band of Brothers. His character survived a gunshot to the head after the war ended while on occupation duty.

In the film Last Orders, he played a younger version of Lenny, his father David's character.
He is also an actor in London's West End Theatre, and played vicar Jamie Flynn in Heartbeat (2006).

As of 2022, Hemmings runs an AirBnb in London.

References

Sources

External links
 

1970 births
Living people
American male film actors
American male stage actors